Mark Hatton may refer to:

Mark Hatton (luger) (born 1973), British luger 
Mark Hatton (cricketer) (born 1974), Australian cricketer